The 2020 Oceania Canoe Slalom Championships took place in Auckland, New Zealand from 1 to 3 February 2020 under the auspices of International Canoe Federation (ICF). The event was hosted at Vector Wero Whitewater Park for the 3rd time.

There were 128 entries from 11 nations.

Olympic Qualification
This event also served as the Oceanian qualification for the postponed 2020 Summer Olympics in Tokyo. The only available quota was for the men's C1 event, after Australia and New Zealand earned quotas for the other Olympic disciplines at the 2019 World Championships in La Seu d'Urgell.

Daniel Watkins secured the final quota for Australia by winning the C1 event.

Medal summary

Men

Women

Medals Table

References

External links
 International Canoe Federation

Oceania Canoe Slalom Championships
Oceania Canoe Slalom Championships